Yuzhou Prison is a prison in the municipality of Chongqing, China. It holds political prisoners and Falun Gong persons.

See also
List of prisons in Chongqing municipality

References
Laogai Research Foundation Handbook

Prisons in Chongqing